Déleg  is a canton of Ecuador, located in the Cañar Province.  Its capital is the town of Déleg.  Its population at the 2001 census was 6,221.

References

Cantons of Cañar Province